The Great Despiser is Joe Pug's second studio album. The album's opening track, "Hymn #76," was selected by American Songwriter magazine as one of the Top 50 Songs of 2012.

Track listing

 "Hymn #76" – 3:37
 "Those Thankless Years" – 3:05
 "The Great Despiser" – 4:05
 "A Gentle Few" – 3:53
 "Ours" – 4:03
 "Silver Harps and Violins" – 4:13
 "Stronger Than The World" – 3:16
 "One of Many" – 3:09
 "Neither Do I Need A Witness" – 3:26
 "The Servant's Ace" – 3:11
 "Deep Dark Wells" – 2:51

Credits
Joe Pug - Composer, Guitar (Acoustic), Guitar (Tenor), Harmonica, Primary Artist, Vocals
Don Bartlett - Management
Jim Becker - Banjo, Fiddle, Mandolin, Slide Guitar
Josh Brinkman - Booking
Brian Deck - Drums, Mixing, Producer
Craig Finn - Vocals
Dorian Gehring - Assistant
Sam Kassirer - Marimba, Organ, Piano
Mike Novak - Assistant
Gordon Patriarca - Bass
Neil Strauch - Engineer
Shawn Stucky - Artwork, Design
Greg Tuohey - Guitar (Acoustic), Guitar (Electric)
Harvey Thomas Young - Composer

References

2012 albums
Joe Pug albums
Lightning Rod Records albums